Floridocassis is a genus of tortoise beetles in the family Chrysomelidae, containing a single species, F. repudiata.

References

Further reading

 
 
 
 

Cassidinae
Monotypic Chrysomelidae genera
Articles created by Qbugbot